Annaiyum Pithavum is a 1969 Indian Tamil-language drama film directed by Krishnan–Panju and written by V. C. Guhanathan for AVM Productions. The film stars A. V. M. Rajan, Vanisri, Sivakumar and Lakshmi. It was released on 19 September 1969, and became a commercial success.

Plot 

Ponnaiah, a factory worker, loses his eyesight after an accident, and his family faces financial crisis. Hence, his son Bhaskar decides to go to work to support the family.

Cast 
 A. V. M. Rajan
 Vanisri
 Sivakumar
 Lakshmi
 V. K. Ramasamy
 Cho
 Manorama
 V. Nagayya as Ponnaiah
 G. Sakunthala
 T. R. Ramachandran
 S. N. Lakshmi
 V. Gopalakrishnan
 M. Bhanumathi

Production 
Annaiyum Pithavum was directed by Krishnan–Panju, and produced by M. Murugan, M. Kumaran and M. Saravanan under AVM Productions. V. C. Guhanathan wrote the screenplay.

Soundtrack 
The music was composed by M. S. Viswanathan, and the lyrics were written by Kannadasan.

Release and reception 
Annaiyum Pithavum was released on 19 September 1969. The critic from The Indian Express called the film "a very familiar story told in very familiar terms" and described the screenplay as "very naive", but praised the performances of Nagayya, Gopalakrishnan and Vanisri, while opining that the rest of the cast was "unimpressive". The film became a commercial success.

References

External links 
 

1960s Tamil-language films
1969 drama films
1969 films
AVM Productions films
Films about blind people in India
Films directed by Krishnan–Panju
Films scored by M. S. Viswanathan
Indian drama films